Printz is a surname and may refer to:

People
 Armegot Printz (1625–1695), Swedish noblewoman, daughter of Johan Björnsson Printz
 David Printz (born 1980), Swedish ice hockey player
 Gisèle Printz (born 1933), French politician
 Göran Printz-Påhlson (1931-2006), Swedish poet
 Johan Björnsson Printz (1592–1663), 17th-century Swedish governor of New Sweden
 Mary Printz (1923-2009), American answering service operator
 Stefan Printz-Påhlson (born 1950), Danish writer
 Wolfgang Printz (1641–1717), German composer

Other
 Printz Board (born 1982), American musician
 Michael L. Printz Award, young adult book award named after a Kansas librarian
 Printz v. United States, 1997 US Supreme Court case

See also
 
 Prin (disambiguation)
 Prince (disambiguation)
 Prins (disambiguation)